ATRAN may refer to:
ATRAN, a Russian cargo airline
ATRAN (Automatic Terrain Recognition And Navigation), a radar map-matching system developed by Goodyear Aircraft Corporation in the 1950s and used in the MGM-13 Mace missile

Atran may refer to:
Ätran (river), river in south-western Sweden
Ätran (locality), locality in Falkenberg Municipality, Sweden, named after the river
Scott Atran (born 1952), American and French anthropologist
 Atran, an organisation in the Ability webcomic

See also 
 Atrane, a heterocyclic organic compound
 Atrans, the Roman name for Trojane, a town in Slovenia